Airlift Technologies was  a Pakistani company that offered instant delivery service. It was founded in March 2019. It closed all operations on 13th July 2022.
Customers of the company used a mobile application or website to order groceries and essentials online, and airlift and secure the items from their warehouse, delivering the items to the consumer within 30 minutes.

History
The idea of Airlift was conceived by the founding Chief Executive Usman Gul after he experienced the congestion during his visit to Lahore for vacations which was caused by the inefficiency of local transportation. 

In March 2019, Gul along with a small team founded the Airlift and launched its operations with a pilot project in Lahore. Gul initially self funded the startup using US$ 50,000. 

As of July 2019, the company was operating in two Pakistani cities, Karachi and Lahore. In August 2019, Airlift raised $2.2 million in seed funding from local and international institutions.

According to a report, Airlift acquired 50,000 riders in Lahore in less than five months of its operations. In November 2019, the company raised Series A funding of $12 million which included participation from American venture capital firm First Round Capital.

Funding 

Airlift introduced an online grocery service in Pakistan with the name of "Airlift Express" bringing $10 Million foreign investment. Later in 2021, Airlift secured 85 million USD funding in Series B financing which is the largest in Pakistan.

See also
 Swvl
 Ridesharing company

References

 Companies based in Lahore
 Transport companies of Pakistan
 Transport companies established in 2019
 Pakistani companies established in 2019